All Blues is an album by the Kenny Clarke/Francy Boland Big Band featuring performances recorded in Germany in 1969 and released on the MPS label.

Reception

AllMusic awarded the album 3 stars.

Track listing
All compositions by Francy Boland, except where indicated.
 "The Wildman" (Kenny Clarke) - 6:19
 "The Jamfs are Coming" (Johnny Griffin) - 5:55 
 "At Ronnie's" (Benny Bailey) - 4:23
 "All Blues 1st Movement: Open Door" - 5:18
 "All Blues 2nd Movement: Dia Blue" - 9:22
 "All Blues 3rd Movement: Total Blues" - 2:58

Personnel 
Kenny Clarke - drums
Francy Boland - piano, arranger
Benny Bailey, Tony Fisher, Duško Gojković, Idrees Sulieman - trumpet
Nat Peck, Åke Persson, Eric van Lier - trombone
Derek Humble - alto saxophone 
Johnny Griffin, Ronnie Scott, Tony Coe - tenor saxophone
Sahib Shihab - baritone saxophone, flute
Jean Warland (tracks 1 & 6), Jimmy Woode (tracks 2-5) - bass

References 

1971 albums
Kenny Clarke/Francy Boland Big Band albums
MPS Records albums